Ivan Eduardo Nóbrega da Silva (born 24 July 1990) is a Portuguese footballer who plays as a defender for Armacenenses.

Career
Silva had youth stints with Clube Desportivo Checul, Louletano, Internacional de Almancil and Vålerenga. In 2009, Silva joined Quarteirense prior to joining Angolan Girabola team Benfica Luanda in 2011. He then returned to Portugal to play for Quarteira and Lagoa, before moving to Greece to sign for Anagennisi Epanomi of the Football League. He played six times for Anagennisi Epanomi, which included his professional debut on 27 January 2013 during a loss to Iraklis. Subsequent moves to Oppsal IF and Anagennisi Giannitsa followed. 2014 saw Silva join Campeonato de Portugal's Louletano, who he played for in 2002 and 2003.

He featured seven times for Louletano during the 2014–15 season. In January 2015, he joined fellow Campeonato de Portugal team Quarteirense; one of his ex-clubs. He scored in his third appearance back for Quarteirense, in a 3–1 win versus Aljustrelense on 1 March. For the 2015–16 Campeonato de Portugal, Silva played for Castrense and made twenty-two appearances as they were relegated. On 19 April 2016, Silva joined ÍF Huginn of Iceland's 1. deild karla. His debut arrived on 7 May in a win away to Fjarðabyggð. Silva returned to Portugal in 2017 to join Almancilense, which preceded a move to Armacenenses in 2018.

Olhanense signed Silva on 1 July 2018. After just three appearances in the following three months, he departed to sign for Oleiros. His first appearance came during a win over União de Leiria on 2 December. Silva left at the conclusion of 2018–19, subsequently rejoining Armacenenses in July 2019.

Career statistics
.

References

External links

1990 births
Living people
People from Faro, Portugal
Portuguese sportspeople of Angolan descent
Portuguese footballers
Association football defenders
Portuguese expatriate footballers
Expatriate footballers in Norway
Expatriate footballers in Angola
Expatriate footballers in Greece
Expatriate footballers in Iceland
Portuguese expatriate sportspeople in Norway
Portuguese expatriate sportspeople in Angola
Portuguese expatriate sportspeople in Greece
Portuguese expatriate sportspeople in Iceland
Campeonato de Portugal (league) players
Girabola players
Football League (Greece) players
Norwegian Third Division players
1. deild karla players
C.D.R. Quarteirense players
S.L. Benfica (Luanda) players
Anagennisi Epanomi F.C. players
Oppsal IF players
Anagennisi Giannitsa F.C. players
Louletano D.C. players
Íþróttafélagið Huginn players
S.R. Almancilense players
C.F. Os Armacenenses players
S.C. Olhanense players
A.R.C. Oleiros players
Sportspeople from Faro District